The straight sinus, also known as tentorial sinus or the , is an area within the skull beneath the brain. It receives blood from the inferior sagittal sinus and the great cerebral vein, and drains into the confluence of sinuses.

Structure 
The straight sinus is situated within the dura mater, where the falx cerebri meets the midline of tentorium cerebelli. It forms from the confluence of the inferior sagittal sinus and the great cerebral vein. It may also drain blood from the superior cerebellar veins and veins from the falx cerebri. In cross-section, it is triangular, contains a few transverse bands across its interior, and increases in size as it proceeds backward. It is usually around 5 cm long.

Variation 
The straight sinus is usually an unpaired structure. However, there may be two straight sinuses, which may be one on top of the other or parallel.

Function 
The straight sinus allows blood to drain from the inferior center of the head outwards posteriorly. It receives blood from the inferior sagittal sinus, great cerebral vein, posterior cerebral veins, superior cerebellar veins and veins from the falx cerebri.

Additional images

See also 

 Dural venous sinuses

References

External links 
 http://neuroangio.org/venous-brain-anatomy/venous-sinuses/

Veins of the head and neck